Kostyantyn Kostyantynovych Leontovich (born October 13, 1985), better known as Kostya Leontovich, is a Ukrainian film score composer, record producer, musician, mixer, singer-songwriter, founder of the label Musicball Records and Musicball Rock School.

Personal life 
Kostya Leontovich was born and raised in Kyiv, the son of Marianna and Kostyantin Leontovich. He has one older sister, Alexandra, and one younger brother, David. His father, Kostyantyn Pavlovych Leontovich was skilled at singing and playing guitar. Kostya received his first musical lessons from him. His mother, Marianna Olegovna Leontovich is also a singer and a music teacher. As a child Kostya, tried almost all kinds of arts and activities – dances, singing in choir, piano, acrobatics, basketball, and even the circus arts. But from the age of 15 years decided to become a musician.
Kostya Leontovich married Anna Leontovich in 2012, and the couple had a son in 2015.

Career 

Although he had been performing since he was five, when he was singing on the stage of art school and even was a part of a tour to France at nine, Kostya Leontovich didn't start playing the guitar until he was fourteen. He received his first guitar lessons from his father and as a teenager started his own punk rock band. Then he played at the University musical group. At this time, Kostya began to write songs and by 2005 had about a hundred of them. The same year he founded the alternative rock band PICK-UP. They performed a lot and released one full length album and several EPs and singles worldwide.

2011 Against the Flow – EP
Besides being the main singer-songwriter for PICK-UP, Leontovich has also made musical contributions outside his band and worked as a solo artist. In June 2011, he released his debut EP, Against the Flow, independently, playing almost all instruments. The lyrical depth to Kostya's songs reflect his faith in God and personal experience.

2013 MusicBall Rock School
Kostya started teaching guitar lessons during his school years and a lot of experience, number of students, as well as personal methods led him to the idea of creating an educational institution in which besides ordinary guitar lessons, the student will be able to play in a band, perform at the rock shows and recording songs in the studio. Thus in 2013 Leontovich founded MusicBall Rock School.

Filmography

Solo discography

Singles
 2010 Heavenly Atmosphere
 2015 More Than Rock and Roll
 2016 Amazing
 2017 Home
 2018 Salvation
 2018 Pafkindayl Theme
 2019 Door to Eternity

Extended plays

PICK-UP Discography

Studio albums

Extended plays

Video

Official Music Video 
 Heavenly Atmosphere
 We Praise
 Against The Flow

References

External links
 Official Website
 Official YouTube Page
 Leontovich's Twitter

1985 births
Living people
Ukrainian guitarists
Ukrainian rock guitarists
Ukrainian composers
Ukrainian musicians
21st-century Ukrainian musicians
21st-century guitarists